Jiangyou is a Chinese county-level city located in Mianyang, Sichuan. The city proper is subdivided into four urban districts and has jurisdiction over 21 towns, and 19 rural townships. It is the hometown of Li Bai, a leading Tang Dynasty poet.

Administrative divisions
Jiangyou has five subdistricts, 30 towns and 10 townships.

Subdistricts
Changgang 
Huaping
Wudu
Hanzeng
Zhongba

Towns
Zhangming
Chonghua
Sanhe
Hanzeng
Longfeng
Yongsheng
Shuanghe
Hekou
Majiao
Qinglian
Wudu
Yanmen
Xinan
Zhanqi
Jiuling
Taiping
Dakang
Erlangmiao
Xiaoxiba
Houba
Xiping
Guanshan
Dayan
Wensheng
Fangshui
Xiangshui
Bayi
Yixin
Dongxing

Townships
Liuhe
Tongxing
Xinchun
Xinxing
Shiyuan
Fengshun
Jingyuan
Yunji
Zhongxing
Dongan

Climate

References

External links

Official website of Jiangyou Government

 
County-level cities in Sichuan
Mianyang